King's Carriage House is a New American cuisine restaurant, tea room, and wine bar located at 251 East 82nd Street (between Second Avenue and Third Avenue), on the Upper East Side in Manhattan, in New York City.

It opened in 1995.  It is owned by Elizabeth King (a chef) and Paul Farrell (who runs the dining room).

Menu
The restaurant serves afternoon tea from 3 to 4 PM, for which reservations are required.  The New American cuisine menu includes items such as grilled filet mignon, roasted breast of duck, roast goose, and pheasant potpie.

Restaurant
The small four-room restaurant is an 1870s former carriage house . The restaurant has antique wood furniture, tartan curtains, and antique silver teapots.  It has three dining rooms: the Hunt Room, the Red Room, and the Willow Room. The attire is "jackets optional".

Reviews
In 2013, Zagats gave the restaurant a food rating of 22, and a decor rating of 25.

See also
 List of New American restaurants

References

External links
www.kingscarriagehouse.com

Restaurants in Manhattan
Restaurants established in 1995
Upper East Side
New American restaurants in New York (state)